Corno Baitone is a mountain of Lombardy, Italy. It has an elevation of 3330 metres.

References

Mountains of the Alps
Alpine three-thousanders
Mountains of Lombardy